Vegakkollai is a village panchayat in Panruti (Taluk) of Cuddalore district in Tamil Nadu.
Vegakkollai is located 14.9 km distance from its Taluk Main Town Panruti.

Vegakkollai is 24.1 km far from its district head Cuddalore. It is 173 km far from its Tamil Nadu state capital city Chennai.

Nearby villages 

 Keelakollai (4 km)
 Ayeepettai (1.2 km)
 Vengadampettai (1.5 km)
 Koranapattu (2.8 km)
 Krishnankuppam (4 km)
 Arasadikuppam (4 km)
 Siruthondamadevi (3 km)
 A. Puthur (2 km)
 Co. Chathiram (2 km)
 Kananchavadi (4 km)

Nearby towns 

 Indira nagar, Neyveli (6 km)
 Kurinjipadi (10.3 km)
 Panruti (14.9 km)
 Annagramam (16.9 km)
 Cuddalore (21 km)
 Vadalur (15 km)

Vegakkollai village areas 
 Vegakkollai Village
 Vegakkollai Pudur
 Kattu Vegakkollai
 Vegakkollai Sathram
This panchayat has a population of nearly 5,000 people. It is 6 km from Neyveli.

Places of workship 

Vegakkollai has,
 the ancient Kalapar Eswaran Kovil
 the ancient Murugan Kovil
 Kali Kovil
 Mariamman Kovil
 Pillayar Kovil
 Iyyanar Kovil
 Purathaman Aalayam.
Ranganathar temple in Vengadampettai, which is 1.5 km from Vegakkollai. It has the world's biggest statue of Ranganathar in a sleeping pose. The temple is about 1000 Years old.

Economy 

Vegakkollai village is surrounded with cashew nut groves and jack fruit trees. The primary occupation of the people in Vegakkollai is agriculture. Most of the people follow organic farming, as it is advantageous for the Environment. Major crops cultivated are Banana, Sugarcane, Ground nuts etc. Also other activities like cashew nut shelling and cashew export business starting from small to large in scale, jack fruit and bananas.

People here are self-employed, in government jobs and working as engineers from Mechanical industry to IT industry.

The nursery garden business is practised by many in the village these produce mainly saplings of flowers plant like country rose, casuarina hybrid clones, Kanagambaram, Jasmine etc.

Now Vegakkollai had emerged as one of the biggest hub for nursery gardens and Horticulture. Many Graduate's from the village are the Horticulturists and pursuing nursery business.
Nursery gardens here use different propagation techniques like cutting, layering, grafting and budding. And raise the different varieties like tree saplings (Causarina, papaya, guava etc.), flowering plants (Kanakabaram, rose etc.) and medicinal herbs (Tulsi, karpooravalli). It also includes related services in plant conservation, landscape restoration, landscape and garden design/construction / maintenance, arboriculture, horticultural therapy, and much more. This range of food, medicinal, environmental, and social products and services are all fundamental to developing and maintaining human health and well-being. vegakkollai is now famous in horticulture.

Education 

Schools in Vegakkollai include Panchayat Union Middle School and Panchayat Union Elementary School

Elected Representatives 
Vegakollai (Which Include Vegakollai, Vegakollai Puthur, Kattu vegakollai and Vegakollai Chathiram). Nearly 2300 Voter's In This Panchayat

Vegakkollai belongs to the Neyveli MLA constituency and Cuddalore Loksabha constituency.

Bank 
1. Canara Bank (its, ATM facility at Vegakollai-Chathiram)
2. Tamil Nadu co-operative society

Bus Services 

Tamil Nadu Villupuram Transport Corporation operate bus services for vegakkolai with the below mentioned bus route.
Bus 21 links Panruti to Kurinjipadi, (Via) Keelakollai, Vegakkollai.
Bus 10 links Cuddalore to Vegakkollai (Via) Kullanchavadi
Bus 20 links Panruti to Kurinjipadi, (Via) kadapulliyur register office, Vegakkollai.

Bus Route No: 21 
 Bus Routes of 21 : Panruti—via kadapulliyur, Keelakollai, Vegakollai, Ayeepettai, Vengadampettai, Annadanampettai (Link Road), Paacharapalayam (Link Road), Meenachipettai, Railway Bus Stop (Kuruinchi Padi), Perumal Kovil, Kuruinchi Padi (Bus Stand)

Bus no:21 Timing

Starts from Panruti : Starts from Panruti :  6.20am, Vegakollai : 7.00am, Ends at Kuruinchipadi : 7.20am Starts from Panruti : 10.00am, Vegakollai : 11.20am, Ends at Kuruinchipadi : 11.50am Starts from Panruti :  4.20pm, Vegakollai : 5.00am, Ends at Kuruinchipadi : 5.20pm Starts from Panruti :  7.20am, Vegakollai : 8.00am, Ends at Kuruinchipadi : 8.20pm

Starts from Kuruinjipadi : Starts from Kuruinchipadi :   7.50am, Vegakollai : 8.15am, Ends at Panruti : 8.50am Starts from Kuruinchipadi :  11.50am, Vegakollai : 12.15pm, Ends at Panruti : 12.50pm Starts from Kuruinchipadi :   5.50pm, Vegakollai : 6.30pm, Ends at Panruti : 7.00pmStarts from Kuruinchipadi :   8.50pm, Vegakollai : 9.30pm, Ends at Panruti : 10.15pm

Bus Route No: 10 
 Bus Routes of 10 : Cuddalore—via Kullanchavadi, Ambalavanan Pet, kattiyankuppam,Chatiram, Thani pathalutti, kattu-vegakollai, Vegakollai, Ayeepettai

Bus no:10 Timing

Starts from Vegakollai  : Starts from Vegakollai :  5.00am, Ends at Cuddalore : 6.20am Starts from Vegakollai :  8.30am, Ends at Cuddalore : 11.20am Starts from Vegakollai : 12.30pm, Ends at Cuddalore : 1.50pm Starts from Vegakollai :  3.00pm, Ends at Cuddalore : 4.10pm Starts from Vegakollai :  6.00pm, Ends at Cuddalore : 7.20pm Starts from Vegakollai :  8.30pm, Ends at Cuddalore : 9.40pm

Starts from Cuddalore : Starts from Cuddalore :  6.30am, Ends at Vegakollai : 8.00am Starts from Cuddalore : 11.20am, Ends at Vegakollai : 12.10pm Starts from Cuddalore :  1.50pm, Ends at Vegakollai : 2.50pm Starts from Cuddalore :  4.20pm, Ends at Vegakollai : 5.50pm Starts from Cuddalore :  7.30pm, Ends at Vegakollai : 8.50pmStarts from Cuddalore :  9.50pm, Ends at Vegakollai : 11.00pm

Bus Route No: 20  

 Bus Routes of 30 : Panruti—via kadapulliyur register office, Chinna poorakani, Periya Poorakani, Varisangkupam, kanachavadi, Azhagapasamuthiram, Arasadikupam, Chiruthadamadevi, A. Pudur, Thani pathalutti, Kattu-vegakollai, Vegakollai, Ayeepettai, Vengadampettai, Annadanampettai (Link Road), Paacharapalayam (Link Road), Meenachipettai, Railway Bus Stop (Kuruinchi Padi), Perumal Kovil, Kuruinchi Padi (Bus Stand)

Bus no:30 Timing

Starts from Panruti : Starts from Panruti :  7.45am, Vegakollai : 8.50am, Ends at Kuruinchipadi : 9.15am
Starts from Kuruinjipadi : Starts from Kuruinchipadi :   9.00am, Vegakollai : 10.00am, Ends at Panruti : 10.50am

References

Villages in Cuddalore district